Stefan Edberg defeated Boris Becker in the final, 4–6, 7–6(7–2), 6–4, 6–2 to win the gentlemen's singles tennis title at the 1988 Wimbledon Championships. Most of the final was played on the third Monday. On the Sunday, Becker and Edberg only managed 22 minutes of constantly interrupted play due to rain, and managed just five games, with Edberg leading 3–2 in the first set. The rest of the final was played the next day

Pat Cash was the defending champion, but lost in the quarterfinals to Becker.

Reigning Australian Open and French Open champion Mats Wilander attempted to become the first man to achieve the Surface Slam (winning majors on hard court, clay and grass in the same calendar year), and also attempted to become the first man to win the Australian Open, French Open and Wimbledon titles since Rod Laver in 1969. He lost to Miloslav Mečíř in the quarterfinals.

Three-time champion John McEnroe competed for the first time since 1985, losing in the second round to Wally Masur. This tournament also featured the first appearance of future champion Goran Ivanišević.

Seeds

  Ivan Lendl (semifinals)
  Mats Wilander (quarterfinals)
  Stefan Edberg (champion)
  Pat Cash (quarterfinals)
  Jimmy Connors (fourth round)
  Boris Becker (final)
  Henri Leconte (fourth round)
  John McEnroe (second round)
  Miloslav Mečíř (semifinals)
  Tim Mayotte (quarterfinals)
  Anders Järryd (second round)
  Jonas Svensson (third round)
  Emilio Sánchez (second round)
  Andrei Chesnokov (first round)
  Amos Mansdorf (second round)
  Slobodan Živojinović (fourth round)

Qualifying

Draw

Finals

Top half

Section 1

Section 2

Section 3

Section 4

Bottom half

Section 5

Section 6

Section 7

Section 8

References

External links

 1988 Wimbledon Championships – Men's draws and results at the International Tennis Federation

Men's Singles
Wimbledon Championship by year – Men's singles